Moses Rountree House is a historic home located at Wilson, Wilson County, North Carolina.  It was built about 1869, and is a two-story, three bays wide by two bays deep, Gothic Revival style frame house.  It has a two-story rear ell. It has a steep gable roof and is sheathed in weatherboard.  The house was moved in 1890 and about 1920, and was renovated in the 1930s adding Colonial Revival style design elements.

It was listed on the National Register of Historic Places in 1982.

References

Houses on the National Register of Historic Places in North Carolina
Gothic Revival architecture in North Carolina
Colonial Revival architecture in North Carolina
Houses completed in 1869
Houses in Wilson County, North Carolina
National Register of Historic Places in Wilson County, North Carolina
1869 establishments in North Carolina